Tony Alvin Ables (born December 28, 1954) is an American serial killer who murdered one man and later three women and girls of various ages in the Tampa Bay area. Officially convicted of two murders, Ables was later connected via DNA evidence to two other murders in 2006: of 84-year-old retiree Adeline McLaughlin in 1983, and his 31-year-old girlfriend Deborah Kisor in 1987. Despite their romantic involvement, Ables was not charged with Kisor's killing, and is yet to be tried for McLaughlin's. He is currently serving a life sentence for killing another girlfriend, 48-year-old Marlene Burns, in 1990.

Murders
Ables' first murder occurred at age 15 in 1970, when he killed a man during a robbery in St. Petersburg. He was quickly arrested for that murder, and in March 1971 pled guilty to first-degree murder, receiving a life sentence. In 1983, after serving 12 years at a state prison, he was released on parole and got a job as a construction worker.

Five months after his release, on June 25, he broke into the apartment of 83-year-old Adeline McLaughlin, a retired widow from Worcester, Massachusetts, by breaking through her window. He suffocated McLaughlin with a pillow and then proceeded to burglarize her apartment. The killing shocked the neighboring tenants, who knew Adeline as a mysterious yet friendly old lady.

On Valentine's Day, 1987, Ables sexually assaulted and murdered his 31-year-old girlfriend at the time, Deborah Kisor, of Monterey, California. She was last seen the previous day making a phone call from a payphone in front of an apartment building. Her body, dressed in only a blouse and a jacket, was found by a passer-by walking along a path near Roser Park bridge. She had bruises on her legs, with a blue pair of jeans laying beside the body. Despite being romantically involved with Kisor, Ables was not arrested as a suspect in her murder at the time.

On June 4, 1990, after getting into a drunken argument with his new girlfriend and roommate, 48-year-old Marlene Burns, Ables pushed her down the stairs, beating and kicking her to death afterwards. As he was leaving the apartment and wiping the blood off his hands, he was seen by witnesses, who had already called the authorities to report a domestic dispute. When police arrived, they arrested Tony on the spot and soon charged him with first-degree murder, holding him without bail at the Pinellas County jail.

Trial and imprisonment
In early June, Tony Ables was convicted of killing Burns and sentenced to die in the electric chair, but two years later, his sentence was commuted to life imprisonment by Justice Bob Barker. The reason for this was that Ables suffered from mental health issues, a claim that was corroborated by his brother Anthony, who said that their rocky childhood, in which their father abused their mother to the extent that she left the family, was a definite contributing factor.

The McLaughlin and Kisor murders remained unsolved until 2006, when homicide detectives submitted Ables' DNA to the Florida Department of Law Enforcement, which matched with evidence found on both women's bodies. Ables was not charged with killing Kisor but officials consider the case closed. As for the McLaughlin murder, he was officially booked for it, but has yet to be charged. According to Police Major Michael Puetz, there is a strong possibility that Ables could be responsible for other crimes, for which he has yet to be connected with.

See also
 List of serial killers in the United States

References

External links
 Serial Dispatches article
 Florida Department of Corrections Information

1954 births
20th-century American criminals
American people convicted of murder
American people convicted of robbery
American rapists
American serial killers
Criminals from Florida
Living people
Male serial killers
Minors convicted of murder
People convicted of murder by Florida
People from St. Petersburg, Florida
Prisoners sentenced to death by Florida
Prisoners sentenced to life imprisonment by Florida